Gunnestad is a surname. Notable people with the surname include:

Astrid Gunnestad (1938–2016), Norwegian journalist and radio presenter
Lars Gunnestad (born 1971), Norwegian motorcycle speedway rider
Stig-Arne Gunnestad (born 1962), Norwegian curler

Surnames of Norwegian origin